Horstedt (North Frisian: Hoorst) is a municipality in the district of Nordfriesland, in Schleswig-Holstein, Germany.

References

Nordfriesland